Dharmajigudem is a village and a major panchayat in the district of West Godavari, Andhra Pradesh, India.

Demographics 

 Census of India, Dharmajigudem had a population of 8564. The total population constitute, 4287 males and 4277 females with a sex ratio of 998 females per 1000 males. 814 children are in the age group of 0–6 years, with sex ratio of 911. The average literacy rate stands at 76.15%.

References

Villages in West Godavari district